Stanko Miloš (born 5 December 1952) is a Croatian rower. He competed in the men's coxed pair event at the 1976 Summer Olympics.

References

1952 births
Living people
Croatian male rowers
Olympic rowers of Yugoslavia
Rowers at the 1976 Summer Olympics
People from Primorje-Gorski Kotar County